Season 1882–83 was the 7th season in which Hibernian competed at a Scottish national level, entering the Scottish Cup for the 6th time.

Overview 

Hibs reached the quarter-final of the Scottish Cup, losing 6–0 to the Arthurlie in a replay.

Results 

All results are written with Hibs' score first.

Scottish Cup

See also
List of Hibernian F.C. seasons

Notes

External links 
 Results For Season 1882/1883 in All Competitions, www.ihibs.co.uk

Hibernian F.C. seasons
Hibernian